Zhang Jiajie (born 27 February 1997) is a Chinese footballer who currently plays for Chinese Super League side Guangzhou R&F.

Club career
Zhang Jiajie was promoted to Chinese Super League side Guangzhou R&F's first team squad by manager Dragan Stojković in July 2016. In August 2017, he was loaned to Guangzhou R&F's satellite team R&F (Hong Kong) in the Hong Kong Premier League. On 9 September 2017, he made his senior debut in a 3–2 away loss to Hong Kong Pegasus. Zhang returned to Guangzhou R&F in the summer of 2018. On 18 August 2018, he made his debut for the club in a 5–2 home win over Changchun Yatai, coming on as a substitute for Xiao Zhi in the half time.

On 1 March 2019, Zhang was loaned to League One newcomer Sichuan Longfor for the 2019 season.

Career statistics 
.

References

External links
 

1997 births
Living people
Association football midfielders
Chinese footballers
Footballers from Guangzhou
Guangzhou City F.C. players
R&F (Hong Kong) players
Sichuan Longfor F.C. players
Chinese Super League players
China League One players
Hong Kong Premier League players
21st-century Chinese people